Matías Juan de Veana (Xàtiva, c. 1656after 1708) was a Spanish composer. He was chapelmaster both at the Real Monasterio de la Encarnación and at the Monasterio de las Descalzas Reales in Madrid, and became known for his villancicos.

Links

References

Spanish Baroque composers
1650s births
Year of death unknown
Spanish male classical composers
1700s deaths